Nebria fallaciosa is a species of ground beetle in the Nebriinae subfamily that is endemic to China.

Subspecies
Nebria fallaciosa fallaciosa Ledoux & Roux, 1992
Nebria fallaciosa farkaci Ledoux & Roux, 1996

References

fallaciosa
Beetles described in 1992
Beetles of Asia
Endemic fauna of China